Vladimir Evgenevich Ivanovsky (9 May 1948 – 3 June 2016) was a Russian diplomat. He last served as the Russian Ambassador to Turkey (2007–2013). He had previously served as the Russian Ambassador to Macedonia (2000–2002) and Serbia and Montenegro (2002–2004).

Born in Moscow, Ivanovsky was the son of Soviet general Yevgeni Ivanovsky (1918–1991). He graduated from the Moscow State Institute of International Relations in 1977. That same year he joined the diplomatic service. He was married and had a son. Aside from his native Russian, he also spoke English, Serbian and Croatian.

Ivanovsky died on 3 June 2016 at the age of 68.

References

1948 births
2016 deaths
Moscow State Institute of International Relations alumni
Diplomats from Moscow
Ambassador Extraordinary and Plenipotentiary (Russian Federation)
Ambassadors of Russia to Serbia
Ambassadors of Russia to Turkey